Caesar Robbins was a war veteran and former slave who lived in the late 1700's to the early 1800's. His legacy is a 540 square foot farmhouse standing in the town of Concord, Massachusetts.

Early life 
Caesar Robbins was born in 1745 in Chelmsford, Massachusetts. He was enslaved at birth, yet the names of his parents and slave owner remain unknown. At 16 years old, Robbins enlisted in the French and Indian War, freeing him from slavery. He then enlisted in a second war, The Revolutionary War, in his early 30’s. He was involved in a very early Revolutionary War conflict on April 19th, 1775, more well known as “the shot heard around the world,” or The Battle of Lexington and Concord. Robbins continued to fight across New England. Only a year later in 1776, he served under Captain Israel Heald in Boston and marched to Fort Ticonderoga in upstate New York in the summer of that same year. There is also evidence Caesar was involved in battles in Bennington, Vermont. He finished his duties near 1779, before he finally moved back to Concord, Massachusetts, as a war veteran.

Later life 
In 1784, Robbins was 40 and living with Carlisle, Massachusetts, with his family. He is said to have had two or three wives who were all local women in Concord. He and his first wife, Catherine Boaz, were married in 1979 until she died. He was then said to have married a woman by the name of Rose Bay in 1807. Caesar had six children among his wives, and moved to a plot of land in Concord, although which of his wives and children he lived with at the time is unclear. The Robbins family resided in an area of Concord known back then as “Great Field,” (now known as Great Meadows) an area where many recently freed or returning African Americans settled. Concord, at the time, had what was considered a large black population, although the population in question was only near  three percent. Many of these African Americans had purchased their freedom through the wars, similar to Caesar. Caesar Robbins would not live to see his family’s land expanded or moved in the later years, as he died in 1822.

Legacy 
In 1823, Caesar Robbins' son, Peter, purchased a small farmhouse at the edge of the Concord River that also included 13 surrounding acres. From the 1820’s until 1837, Peter resided in the home, sharing it with his wife Fatima, his sister and Caesar’s daughter Susan, and Susan’s husband Jack Garrison. Later they also shared the home with Susan and Jack’s children, although it was said that some of the children had passed away a young age. Eventually, the farmhouse was sold to Fatima’s relative, Peter, in 1852, and her relative’s family would ultimately be the last to live at the Robbins House. 

Caesar Robbins was not the only person in the Robbins family to make waves. Susan Robbins, later known as Susan Garrison, became a critical part of Concord’s feminist and anti-slavery movement. She was the founding member of the Concord Female Anti-Slavery Society, otherwise known as CFAS, in 1837. The Robbins House was home to many of the first CFAS meetings, where the committee “signed petitions against slavery, the slave trade, the annexation of Texas, and the removal of the Cherokees from their homeland in the southeastern United States. [Susan also] likely helped found the First African Baptist Church in Boston.” Susan passed in 1841 at about 61 years of age, but her four children continued to carry the passion of the anti-slavery movement. Even Henry David Thoreau, a Massachusetts-bound historic icon, was deeply influenced by the Robbins family and included aspects of their anti-slavery work in his writings.

Modern times 
The Robbins House still stands as a historic landmark in the town of Concord. Mass Humanities, an organization based in Massachusetts, is working with the town of Concord to uphold Caesar Robbins’ history and preserve the Robbins’ house. The organization takes donations for the house and volunteers to clean it consistently and keep an eye on the property. Concord also offers a Guided African American History Tour, where five percent of the proceeds are donated to the Robbins House.  the house is also cleaned and refurbished by locals and surrounding students. There are multiple locations in Concord where Caesar and his legacy can be found. Caesar's Wood and Peter's Field are two places nearing The Robbins House.  Other significant places lying among The Robbins House are Brister Hill, named after Brister Freeman, and even Walden Woods, a famous landmark. The Robbins House is woven among some of Concord's most important history.

References 

Wikipedia Student Program
Military personnel by war